This is a list of all cyclo-cross cyclists who competed at the 2016 UCI Cyclo-cross World Championships in Heusden-Zolder, Belgium from 30 to 31 January 2016. There were for men and women an elite and under-23 race and a men's junior race.

Men's elite

Women's elite

Men's under-23

Women's under-23

Men's junior

References

2016 UCI Cyclo-cross World Championships
Lists of cyclists